Simone Kerseboom (born 26 April 1984) is a Dutch politician of the conservative populist party Forum for Democracy (FvD). She has been a member of the House of Representatives since the 2021 general election and a member of the States of Limburg since 2019. Kerseboom lived in South Africa for about twenty years and holds a doctorate from Rhodes University.

Early life and career 
Kerseboom was born in the North Brabant city of Roosendaal, and she moved with her parents and younger brother in 1996 to South Africa, the country where her mother was born. Her parents had met in South Africa in the 1970s, when her father was working for a dredging project at the port of Port Elizabeth, and he would later become a sea captain. Kerseboom studied history at Rhodes University, obtaining her doctorate after completing her dissertation about the nation state and national identity. Kerseboom returned to the Netherlands in 2015 and started working as an English–Dutch translator, editor, and writer. She owned a business called Novel Translations & Language Services.

Politics 
In 2017, Kerseboom wrote an opinion piece on the website ThePostOnline, in which she warned that "a shared national identity appears to be eroding rapidly" in the Netherlands. She wrote that "any remnants of national pride and values are systematically being replaced by a relentless supranationalism accompanied by the politically correct abstract concepts of multiculturalism and diversity which threaten Dutch sovereignty and national cohesion by emphasizing the differences between citizens instead of celebrating what we have in common".

Kerseboom joined Forum for Democracy and was their second candidate in Limburg in the 2019 provincial elections. The party, a newcomer, won seven seats, causing Kerseboom to receive a seat in the States of Limburg. When FvD's lead candidate left the council to become a member of the provincial executive, Kerseboom succeeded him as caucus leader. In November 2020, newspaper Het Parool published an article about extremist ideas held by members of the party's youth wing, which caused a crisis within Forum for Democracy. Four out of the seven FvD members of the States of Limburg left the party, while Kerseboom expressed her continuing support for party leader Thierry Baudet.

Forum for Democracy announced the following month that Kerseboom would appear fifth on its party list in the 2021 general election. She was elected, receiving 7,025 preference votes, and entered the House of Representatives on 31 March. She kept her seat in the States of Limburg but stepped down as caucus leader. Kerseboom became her party's spokesperson for foreign affairs, foreign trade, education, culture, and science, and she is on the Committees for Education, Culture and Science; for Foreign Affairs; and for Foreign Trade and Development Cooperation. She is also part of the contact groups United Kingdom and United States and of the Benelux Interparliamentary Consultative Council. Kerseboom violated social distancing rules – in effect due to the COVID-19 pandemic – after holding her maiden speech, when fellow member of parliament Gideon van Meijeren congratulated her by kissing and hugging her.

She was FvD's  in Maastricht in the 2022 municipal elections. Kerseboom temporarily stepped down as member of the House of Representatives and the States of Limburg starting on 16 August 2022 because of her maternity leave. She extended her leave starting 6 December but returned to the States Provincial after the sixteen-week period

Personal life 
Kerseboom lives in the Limburg city of Maastricht. She was engaged, while a member of parliament, and her daughter was born in 2022.

References

External links 
 Simone Kerseboom, Houseofrepresentatives.nl

1984 births
Living people
21st-century Dutch politicians
21st-century Dutch women politicians
Dutch translators
Forum for Democracy (Netherlands) politicians
Members of the House of Representatives (Netherlands)
Members of the Provincial Council of Limburg
Politicians from Maastricht
Rhodes University alumni